This is the character page for the 2018 tokusatsu Ultra Series Ultraman R/B.

Minato family

Katsumi Minato
, born on May 23, 1995, is the 23-year-old eldest son who puts family importance above all else, evidenced by his decision to leave his childhood dream of becoming a baseball player and helps his father's business. Despite his critical thinking ability, he is also hot blooded and incapable of observing his surroundings when playing baseball with other townspeople. He works as a clerk in his father's specialty shop and has a keen fashion sense. Initially hesitant, he begins to accept the responsibility of an Ultraman it held and defend Ayaka City from monster attacks.

A year later after Leugocyte's defeat, Katsumi becomes torn in choosing what to do for his future. After getting into an argument with his former high school friend Yukio, Tregear tricked him into being left on Hoster 21 System until the Minato family rescued him as he rejoin the battle. Once returning Yukio to normal, Katsumi handed his former friend his baseball and leaves for Milan to further his study as a fashion designer.

Should both brothers hold the R/B Gyro, they can perceive each other's sense of vision. As Ultraman Rosso, Katsumi adopted his skill as a pitcher through said Ultra's attacks.

In an interview, Yuya mentioned that he draw his favorite Ultraman Taro in a book while his favorite monster is Pigmon.

Isami Minato
, born on April 13, 1999, is a 19-year-old college student studying cosmoarchaeology in honor of his long lost mother. He holds a huge respect to Katsumi for giving up his passion for sports to support their family. A free-spirited youth, Isami prefers to conduct interesting research instead of helping out at the store. Because of his clumsy attitude, he is incapable of expressing his gratitude to others. Alongside Katsumi, he obtained the R/B Gyro during their mother's birthday to transform into Ultraman Blu. Compared to Katsumi, Isami was more open minded with his newfound powers but finds himself guided by his brother during the fight.

In Ultraman R/B the Movie, the Minato brothers stumbled upon a dimensional-displaced Riku, as Isami teamed up with him when Katsumi became stranded in an alien planet. After the fight with Tregear ended, Isami decided to further his study in California.

In addition to R/B Gyro, Isami also created a device that can detect presence of a monster.

Ryosuke nominated his favorite Ultra as Ultraman Tiga, while his favorite monster is King of Mons.

Asahi Minato
, born on March 3, 2001, is the 17-year-old youngest of the Minato siblings, a happy-go-lucky high school girl that is close to her brothers. She has a dislike of conflicts, which extends to the point of refusing to play rock–paper–scissors. On behalf of their mother, she performs the housework. She discovered her brothers' double life as Ultramen and her wish allows the Orb Ring NEO to assist them in defeating Horoboros, and even played a pivotal role on helping her brothers unlock the power of Ultraman Ruebe. Although the Minato family remember Asahi as a baby, the lack of past photos that represent her brings Ushio to doubt her existence. After her closest friend, Saki Mitsurugi sacrifice herself against Leugocyte's beam, she then inherits Saki's Gyro. During the final battle with Leugocyte, she is revealed to be the incarnation of Crystal and creates the Makoto Crystal through the power of the three siblings' bonds.

In Ultraman R/B the Movie, Asahi join forces with her brothers and a dimensional-displaced Ultraman in fighting against Ultraman Tregear's invasion. With Saki's Gyro, she assumed the form of Grigio Regina until Saki's spirit resonated with her, giving birth to Ultrawoman Grigio. After her brothers leave to travel the world, Asahi remains in Ayaka City to protect it for her brothers.

Ushio Minato
, born on May 14, 1968, is a 50-year-old kind father of the Minato family and owner of specialty store . As he lacks awareness of his sons being Ultramen, Ushio mistook his sons' behavior as teenage rebellion. His dream is to design clothes of his brand, "UshioMinato" and had provide financial support to his wife for her research. He refused to believe his wife had disappeared and faithfully waited for her return, with his wish granted at some point before Leugocyte's arrival to Earth.

Mio Minato
, born on July 1, 1968, is the 50-year-old (physically in her mid-30s) matriarch of Minato family who went missing near Mt. Ayaka on her birthday, fifteen years ago. She was a researcher contracted under Aizentech, who funded her past studies with her husband's clothing business. Mio was revealed to have been stranded on an alternate dimension for 15 years while stealing the Gyros after an encounter with Saki Mitsurugi. Due to the time spend in that pocket dimension, Mio physically remains in her mid-30s appearance until she escaped.

There, she learned of her sons becoming Ultra Warriors and receive the prediction of their impending death. Upon her return to Ayaka City, Mio stole the Gyros and prepare to contain Leugocyte in a Monster Crystal in hopes of banishing the monster into said pocket dimension, but her plan fell through due to Saki's intervention. This leads to her trying to use Aizentech tower's black hole generator to banish the monster and herself until her sons destroy the monster as Ultraman Ruebe. With peace returned to Ayaka City, Mio becomes the acting president of Aizentech in Aizen and Saki's absence.

Aizentech
 is a large company that focuses on space exploration and unknown energy research. In the past, Aizentech was originally a small factory named  operated by Makoto's father before he moved it to Ayaka City and provide major contribution to the city, therefore making it as a company town. In the height of frequent monster attacks sent by Chereza, Aizentech had developed an  that render its target in suspended animation. Unfortunately as a result of Saki's actions in ordering Grigio King to be released, the company faced a major crisis due to the declining rate of public trust.

Makoto Aizen
 is the 33-year-old president of Aizentech and a general manager of research. Behind his huge popularity in Ayaka City, Makoto is actually used a host body for Chereza to infiltrate human society 15 years prior to the events of the series and used a medium by the alien to transform into Grigio Bone and Ultraman Orb Dark. After Saki expels Chereza from his body, Makoto names her the new president of Aizentech as he steps down to travel around the world with his bicycle.

D.R.L.N.
While operating outside, she inhabits a white drone to salvage Monster Crystals. Although faithfully serves Chereza, D.R.L.N.'s loyalty is fickle, as she sided with Saki in her plan to detonate Earth and later on shifted to Mio when she returned from another dimension.

As a result of Saki's declaration in bombing Earth in hopes of destroying Leugocyte, D.R.L.N. was hacked by an unknown source to assassinate Saki by controlling Chereza's King Joe unit and put Asahi in a hostage crisis but Saki briefly collaborated with the Minato brothers to save Asahi as Isami purified D.R.L.N. by shutting down the network connection and rebooted her.

Ultramen
The titular Ultras of Ultraman R/B, Rosso and Blu, were originally humanoid orphans from Planet Sanja who were chosen into their self-titled Ultraman forms through the Light of Orb from Planet , Ultraman Orb's home world. The brothers were killed after an attempt at preventing Leugocyte from destroying Earth, leaving behind their R/B Gyros for the Minato brothers to inherit their Ultramen identities while their youngest sister, Grigio, went on to adopt the alias of Saki Mitsurugi and continuing their mission to destroy Leugocyte at the cost of Planet Earth.

Ultraman Rosso
 is a twin-horned Ultraman who bonds with Katsumi Minato in the present day. Since Katsumi is an aspiring baseball player, his skills as a pitcher are sometimes translated into Rosso's fighting stances.

Flame: Rosso's default form accessed via the Taro Crystal, which allows him to convert his energy into fire-based attacks. In this form, he is capable of throwing small fireball projectiles. Although a balanced form, Rosso can exert strength and durability.
Aqua: Rosso's first speed-oriented form accessed via the Ginga Crystal, which allows him to convert his energy into water-based attacks. In this form, he is capable of creating a liquid-like reflective barrier.
Wind: Rosso's second speed form accessed via the Tiga Crystal, which allows him to convert his energy into air-based attacks. In this form, he is capable of both launching miniature cyclones and creating air bubbles.
Ground: Rosso's strength-oriented form accessed via the Victory Crystal, which allows him to convert his energy into Earth-based attacks. In this form, he is capable of summoning a gravity well to trap his opponent.

Ultraman Rosso is voiced by Yuya Hirata, the actor of Katsumi Minato. Hirata also portrayed Rosso's human form in the penultimate episode of Ultraman R/B.

Ultraman Blu
 is a single-horned Ultraman who bonded with Isami to protect him from Grigio Bone's attack. In contrast to his older brother Rosso, Blu excels in mid and close range combat as he wields a single-bladed .

Through Isami's use of the R/B Gyro and R/B Crystals, Blu can perform a Type Change to use different elemental powers:
Aqua: Blu's default form accessed via the Ginga Crystal, which allows him to convert his energy into water-based attacks. In this form, he is capable of both firing a concentrated stream of water and healing a wounded Ultra. Although a balanced form, Blu can exert speed and agility.
Flame: Blu's first strength-oriented form accessed via the Taro Crystal, which allows him to convert his energy into fire-based attacks. In this form, he is capable of launching a barrage of flame bullets.
Wind: Blu's speed form accessed via the Tiga Crystal, which allows him to convert his energy into air-based attacks. In this form, he is capable of increasing his flight speed for aerial combat. However, it tends to wear Blu out quickly.
Ground: Blu's second strength-oriented form accessed via the Victory Crystal, which allows him to convert his energy into Earth-based attacks. In this form, he is capable of firing an energy stream of pebbles.

Ultraman Blu is voiced by Ryosuke Koike, the actor of Isami Minato. Koike also portrayed Blu's human form in the penultimate episode of Ultraman R/B.

Ultraman Ruebe
 is a fusion of Ultraman Rosso and Blu achieved through , created when R/B Crystals of Ultraman and Belial were scanned, followed by fusing with those of Taro, Ginga, Tiga and Victory as Katsumi activates it on the R/B Gyro.

The power of Ultraman Ruebe was already prophesied since Saki's original brothers obtain the crystals in Planet Sanja. However, they fail to utilize their power as the brothers fail to synchronize with their younger sister's heart. In the present day, this was accessed by the Minato brothers upon understanding the wish of their younger sister, which they put to use in against Grigio King. The fusion is only inaccessible if both brothers cannot synchronize properly.

Being a Super Ultraman in general, Ruebe demonstrates the ability to withstand Grigio King's Bone Breathter. His main weapon is the wind and fire wheels , which has two different forms, depending on its user:
: Turns into a buzzsaw-like weapon, imitating Katsumi/Rosso's fighting prowess.
: Allows high speed movements, imitating Isami/Blu's fighting prowess.

Being the fusion of Rosso and Blu, Ruebe is voiced by Yuya Hirata and Ryosuke Koike.

Ultrawoman Grigio
 is the alter-ego of Asahi Minato after inheriting Saki Mitsurugi's Gyro. Despite being inadequate in combat, she is capable of defenses and healing an ally. Her name is based on Saki's actual birth name, which was coined by Asahi as a token of respect to her late friend.

It was first transformed in the middle of fighting against Tregear and Snake Darkness, as Saki's spirit interfered and synchronize with Asahi to turn Grigio Regina into her Ultrawoman namesake. Grigio joins the battle by healing Rosso, Blu and Geed before fusing with her brothers into Ultraman Gruebe. With the Minato brothers left Japan to study abroad, Grigio was remain behind to become Ayaka City's sole protector.

Ultraman Gruebe
 is an Ultra who will appear in Ultraman R/B the Movie. Like Ruebe, Gruebe has access to the R/B Kourin. The only finisher its shown is the Shin Vortech Buster.

Past Ultra Warriors
As a result of Rosso and Blu's crash landing on Earth, they were forcefully dispersed into , which scattered across Ayaka City. The Minato brothers are capable of using them with their R/B Gyros or R/B Sluggers to access different abilities for their Ultramen counterparts.

This crystal usually serves as Rosso's main power of choice.
This crystal usually serves as Blu's main power of choice.
This crystal was originally buried underground and was freed by the Ultras in the middle of a battle with Gue-Basser, allowing Blu to use its power and turn the tables of the battle.
Initially damaged, Makoto (Chereza) fixed it by abducting several people.
: The transformed form of the Orb Origin Crystal once scanned onto the R/B Gyro. It allows Makoto (Chereza) to transform into Ultraman Orb Dark by switching into .
This crystal was obtained by the Minato brothers in a strange cave after saving Asahi, providing them a means of counterattack.
: He was among the two crystals in Saki's possession, named  before relinquish it to Katsumi. When used in conjunction with Belial, they combine with Taro, Ginga, Tiga and Victory to create Kiwami Crystal.
: He was among the two crystals in Saki's possession as  before relinquish it to Isami. Aside from participating in the fusion of Kiwami Crystal, both Ultraman and Belial Crystals are notable for being six times stronger than normal R/B Crystal.
: Although lacking a Crystal of his own, Geed participated in the New Generation Barrier when summoned by New Generation Heroes Crystal. In Ultraman R/B the Movie, Riku finds himself allying with the Minato brothers in against monster attacks in Ayaka City and faces against Ultraman Tregear, whose powers can rival his strongest form, Ultimate Final.  reprises his role as Riku Asakura.

Antagonists

Chereza
 is an extraterrestrial life form and the main antagonist for the first half of the series. Chereza originated from another universe and, inspired by witnessing the heroics of Ultraman Orb, came to Earth where he possessed Makoto and studied the R/B Gyros in Aizentech before Mio left with it. When Mio's sons became Ultramen fifteen years later, Chereza deemed them unworthy of the title and orchestrate monster attacks as he abducted several people to repair the Orb Origin Crystal, effectively giving him the chance to become Ultraman Orb Dark. As he lost the Orb Ring NEO after Horoboros' reign of terror and defeated as Grigio King, Saki effectively exorcise him out and trapped Chereza in Aizentech's ventilation system.

His Gyro broke during Gubila's deployment, forcing him to resort to the real Gyro used by Saki. He was also in brief possession of Orb Ring NEO to become Ultraman Orb Dark. At some point of time, he secretly built the Anti-Monster Restraint System within Aizentech headquarters and a King Joe unit.

Ultraman Orb Dark
 is a jet-black copy of Ultraman Orb's Orb Origin form. A form Chereza assumes through the use of Orb Ring NEO to become an Ultraman as part of his lifelong dream of becoming a hero like Orb, despite initially using the form to fight the Minato brothers in what he considered a popularity contest. When Chereza assumes the form to fight against Horoboros, the very same monster that he summoned to recover the Orb Ring NEO, he loses it when Saki takes control of the monster with Makoto's body injured in the process.

The Orb Ring NEO allows Orb Dark to initiate finishers of Ultraman Orb's Fusion Up forms by pressing the central button.
: Performed by thrusting the sword into the ground and creates electrical sparks.
: Performed by creating a ring of fire before launching it towards the opponent.
: Performed by creating a series of ice eruptions as the ice blocks rain on the target.

Etelgar

 is the primary antagonist of Ultraman Hit Song History: New Generation Chapter, who first appeared in Ultraman Ginga S The Movie. After surviving his defeat, Etelgar plotted his revenge by kidnapping Heisei Ultras again, forcing Zero to recruit Rosso and Blu in his mission. With all Ultras freed, Etelgar tries to fight them until he was defeated by Rosso, Blu, Zero Beyond and Geed.

Saki Mitsurugi/Grigio
, real name , is the sister of Ultramen Rosso and Blu. All three siblings were originally orphans from the war-torn  under tutelage of Bakubarba and raised as thieves and assassins. Of the three siblings, Grigio became tired of her job until she heard the rumors of Planet O-50 in Planet Alcatraz. After a series of encounters by the Balsas Gang, the three siblings ended up on O-50's Warrior's Peak wherein their mutual goal of protecting  brings forth their R/B Gyros and Crystals to transform, using it to combat various evil in outer space. Initially distraught that her form as Grigio Bone only spreads fear, she finally gained respect by the  tribesman after rescuing them as Grigio Regina. During their attempt to fight Leugocyte, the trio siblings and said monster were dragged into a wormhole that leads to an ancient Earth as Rosso and Blu sacrificed themselves to protect Grigio. The impact resulted in the fall of  while Grigio abandons her compassion out of grief for her brothers.

For 13 millennia, Grigio wandered around the Earth to plant space trees to reroute her late brothers' energy back to Japan, meeting with various historical figures and returned to Ayaka City in the present day. Saki first reveals herself during the Minato brothers' fight with Orb Dark, taking control of Horoboros in a display of power before she later purges Chereza from Makoto's body and sealing the alien within Aizentech's ventilation system. Saki then becomes the new president of Aizentech when regaining the Grigio Monster Crystal for her own agenda to destroy Leugocyte even if means destroying Earth while attempting to force the Minato brothers not to interfere. After the incident with the King Joe unit, Saki stole the R/B Gyro's from Katsumi and Isami, calling the two fake Ultramen. The two later attempted to get the Gyro's back, but Saki then tried to kill them, believing that they had found the Gyro's and were unworthy of them because they human. But she was proven wrong when the Gyro's protect the brothers from her blast. She planned on using the Earth as a giant bomb to destroy Leugocyte. Despite Katsumi and Isami saying that she couldn't, she believed that it was the only way. But befriending Asahi causes Saki to have a change of heart and sacrifices herself to save the Minato brothers from Leugocyte's beam, passing her Gyro to Asahi before fading away. A year later when Tregear commences his attack on Ayaka City, Saki's spirit merged with Asahi to turn Grigio Regina into Ultrawoman Grigio.

She is in possession of a different color version of the R/B Gyros, which, unlike Chereza's Gyro, can empower Monster Crystals to their full extent. Saki is incapable of transforming into an Ultra but assumes monster forms through Monster Crystals.

: A monster form of her namesake which was her first transformation through the Gyro. Grigio and its later forms only exist as a transformation and therefore remains in different Monster Crystals before being transformed by users of R/B Gyros.
: The first form of Grigio, able to manipulate flames and fire a million degree flame from her mouth in her  attack. This crystal was Saki's first transformation in O-50, which she uses to assist Rosso and Blu in protecting Frau from the Balsas Gang. During her early days as Grigio Bone, Saki becomes an alternative to fight for her Ultramen brothers should their energy supply depleted. Saki lost the crystal upon her atmospheric entry on Earth, which lead to Chereza acquire it in the present day, initially using Grigio Bone to wreak havoc in Mt. Ayaka in the events that resulted in the Minato brothers first becoming Rosso and Blu. At some point of time, Chereza transformed into Grigio Bone twice through its crystal to fight against the Ultramen. Although the initial fight did not reach his satisfaction, Grigio Bone was defeated once more in an attack against a local hospital when Isami regains his composure to transform and assist Rosso in the nick of time. Saki reclaims it alongside other Monster Crystals in Chereza's possession after expelling him from Makoto's body.
Its Monster Crystal was acquired and utilized by Saki during one of her travels in outer space with her brothers. In the present day, Saki implores Chereza to use the monster as part of her ploy. As Grigio King, Chereza overpowered the Minato brothers until Saki ordered D.R.L.N. to fire the Anti-Monster Restraint System, putting Grigio King in suspended animation. Two days later, Saki purposely had Grigio King released to be defeated when Rosso and Blu formed Ruebe for the first time.
On Earth, Saki used it in her conflict against the Minato brothers and eventually Leugocyte by empowering herself with Monster Crystals and her late brothers' Ray Line energy. After seeing her late brothers' images in the Minato brothers, Grigio Regina sacrificed herself to protect them and reverted to Saki before fading away as Saki. The Crystal and her R/B Gyro were inherited to Asahi as she used it to join Ultraman Ruebe and Geed in against Tregear and Snake Darkness. With the help of Saki's spirit, Grigio Regina transforms into Ultrawoman Grigio.
: Transformed from Saki Mitsurugi, she used it to destroy a stray Gomora and fought against Rosso and Blu until they redirected the Megalos Blaster and uses Ground Explosion to defeat it. It is a tribute to Grand King from Ultraman Story.
: A monster that unleashed on Ayaka City as part of Chereza's plan to outshine the Minato brothers as Orb Dark. Following the destruction of Bezelve, Saki had salvaged the crystal earlier and summons an evolved form of Horoboros that easily defeated all three Ultras at once. In its second rampage, Rosso and Blu managed to defeat it with the Orb Ring NEO's Triple Origium Ray. After deposing of Chereza, Saki assumes Horoboros form to fight the Minato brothers and later a dimension-hopping Kamisori Demaaga, defeated in both cases. In its quadrupedal state, the monster is capable of resisting average beam attacks and performs spinning attack.

Leugocyte
 is the final antagonist of Ultraman R/B. In the past, Leugocyte was part of the  tasked in eliminating threats to the space environment, until Ultraman Tregear altered its DNA to consume several non harmful planets. Rosso, Blu and Grigio were sent from the O-50 to deal with this threat but its might was too much for the three of them to handle. Leugocyte went circling the Earth for 1,300 years while Rosso and Blu died from protecting Grigio.

In the present day, Leugocyte approaches Earth as Grigio, now Saki Mitsurugi, prepared to use the planet as a bomb to destroy it. In order for this to work, she reclaimed her brothers' Gyros from the Minato brothers and attempted to activate all three Gyros at once to force Leugocyte into a corporeal state. Although this plan was successfully carried out by Mio Minato, who tried to banish the Crystal-imprisoned Leugocyte into a different dimension, Saki stole it from her as she remains adamant to her original suicidal plan. Her successful fight against the Minato brothers was exploited by the now corporeal Leugocyte to escape and resume its reign of terror. Seeing as all her plans went south, Mio attempted to banish Leugocyte into a black hole by taking herself and the Aizentech tower with it but was stopped by the Minato brothers as they transform to fight against the monster. With the help of Asahi as Makoto Crystal, Ultraman Ruebe performs Shin Vortech Buster and destroy Leugocyte once and for all.

Upon being sealed within the dragon-element Monster Crystal and escaped, it became , a corporeal dragon-like monster whose invincible to almost every forms of attacks.

Ultraman Tregear

Snake Darkness
 is Ultraman Tregear's monster servant. Originally , Katsumi's former colleague who failed in his dream as a game developer, he was approached by Ultraman Tregear and transformed into Snake Darkness.

After Tregear drives it berserk, the monster can fire the  ray, a stronger version of the Tragedy Shout.

Other characters
: A coach for the White Bears amateur baseball team who previously supported Katsumi in his high school years before he quits baseball. In his retirement day, Kumashiro gave Katsumi the R/B Crystals of Ultraseven, Zero and X, all three of them previously kept by his family for generations under guidance of the Ultramen in their dreams.
: A female student in Isami's college whose desire to fly stems from the boredom of living in a wealthy family. After multiple failures, she was assisted by Isami in creating her mechanical wings and managed to fly in the midst of Gue-Basser's reign of terror. She eventually quit the college and left to study abroad.
: A former policewoman who was notorious for picking up a fight against the Minato brothers in the youth, which in reality, she was trying to protect them from harm. After quitting her job, she travels across the world and visited the Minato family's Quattro M every four years with different jobs. After a recent visit to the Minato family, she was kidnapped by Chereza and bounded into Mecha Gomora as a plot to make the fight against the Ultramen more interesting, until Blu destroyed the monster as Rosso saved her via Wind form. While recovering at a local hospital, she was caught in a crossfire between Grigio Bone and Rosso before Isami joined in with his renewed determination. With the fight ended, Kaoru was fully healed and left the Ayaka City.
 and : Asahi's high school friends.

Monsters and aliens

Monster Crystals
The  are antithesis of the R/B Crystals, which embodied the Ultra Monsters. When inserted into the Gyro, the user can either summon or transform into said monster through their corresponding Crystal. The crystals were collected by Saki during her time fighting for the peace of their homeworld alongside her brothers, Rosso and Blu. She lost several of her sets during their first arrival to Ayaka City, where Chereza collected them for his own ends.

: Black King was summoned by mysterious summoner to attack the Ayaka City during the daylight. After rescuing Isami from a steel beam, Katsumi and the former transform using each other's crystals. They switch back to their original forms and sent the monster flying above before ending its reign of terror with their combined finishers. It can exhale  from its mouth and possess the brute strength of 300,000 t. In terms of close combat, Black King is protected by its durable skin and uses its cranial horn as a weapon. First appeared in episodes 37 and 38 of Return of Ultraman.
: An intelligent space monster that appeared on Ayaka City during the Minato siblings' visit to Aizentech. After saving Blu from his petrifaction, Rosso devised a plan to switch forms and reflected Gargorgon's signature attack to herself before the duo Ultramen finished her with Cross Slugger. Notorious for its ability to destroy a planet, Gargorgon is capable of unleashing energy beams from its shoulders and petrify its opponents via a ray fired from a hidden eye on its mouth. First appeared in episodes 6 and 7 of Ultraman X.
: It was summoned by Chereza twice to interrupt Katsumi's baseball match. Although victorious in the first battle, Red King appeared in the mountains and fought Blu before Rosso joined the battle. With the help of Zero Crystal, Rosso defeated Red King with Zero Twin Slicer. First appeared in episode 8 of Ultraman.
: A giant bird themed after crested ibis that was sent to claim the Tiga Crystal. In Ayaka City, the monster was a formidable opponent towards the Ultramen until the Tiga Crystal surfaced, allowing Blu to assume Wind and counter the monster's cyclone before the two Ultras finished it.
: Summoned by Chereza from its Monster Crystal, Mecha Gomora fought against Rosso and Blu before retreating. In its second appearance, Makoto had Kaoru, an old friend of the Minato brothers bounded into Mecha Gomora. Blu destroyed it with Ultraseven's power while Rosso managed to save the hostage with Wind form. First appeared in Ultra Galaxy Legend Side Story: Ultraman Zero vs. Darklops Zero.
: Summoned as part of an arranged mock fight for Orb Dark. Rosso and Blu interfered their fight and defeated the monster before facing Orb Dark. Aside from the ability to fly, Bezelve can launch  from its mouth. First appeared as one of the major antagonists of Ultraman Orb: The Origin Saga.
: Summoned by Chereza in an attempt to fight against the Minato brothers, unfortunately his Gyro broke and this forced Gubila to shrink before reverting to its Monster Crystal. First appeared in episode 24 of Ultraman.
: A monster that was summoned by Saki to siphon Ayaka City's power supply and redirect them to the Aizentech's main headquarters. First appeared in episode 3 of Ultraman.
: A robot which Chereza built in secret at some point of time, D.R.L.N. awakened it to re-initiate her former master's AZ Plan and at the same time trying to eliminate Saki by kidnapping Asahi in a hostage crisis. Having formed an uneasy alliance with the Minato brothers, Saki managed to rescue her before Rosso and Blu cracked its Pedanium armor and destroy it as Ruebe with Ruebe Vortech Buster. Using her Gyro, Saki harvested the remains of King Joe into a R/B Crystal. First appeared in episodes 14 and 15 of Ultra Seven.

Others
: Appeared from a self-made pit in Ayaka City, it fought against the Ultramen and defeated by Rosso Wind and Blu Flame's Fire Tornado. First appeared in episode 5 of Ultraman Ace.
: A monster that appeared in the cold opening, it was defeated after Blu Ground pummels the Earth with his Earth Bringer and Rosso Wind firing his Sperion Ray. First appeared in episode 1 of Ultra Galaxy Mega Monster Battle: Never Ending Odyssey.
: A Dadaism-themed alien from Planet Dada. He gave an anonymous interview in a NPTV documentary. First appeared in episode 28 of Ultraman.
: A small friendly monster who accidentally sent the invitation to Dada's alien party late for Booska. He was sent by Dada to gather humans for his second attempt to recreate the party. First appeared in episode 8 of Ultraman.
: The titular protagonist from 1966-1967 family sitcom Kaiju Booska. After shrinking Dada for his troubles, Booska apologizes on his behalf as he called a truce between Ultras and monsters for their party.
: A TV director at NPTV who assumes the human identity of  while working on Earth. First appeared in episode 33 of Ultraman.
: A TV assistant director at NPTV who assumes the human identity of  while working on Earth. First appeared in episode 18 of Ultraman.
: A TV producer at NPTV. First appeared in episode 9 of Ultraseven.
: A popular news anchor. First appeared in episode 3 of Ultraseven.
: An alien who received a street interview from the NPTV crew. First appeared in episode 19 of Ultra Seven.
: An alien who received a street interview from the NPTV crew. First appeared in episodes 39 and 40 of Return of Ultraman.
: An ancient monster that lay  dormant under the Ayaka City until Saki's attempt to force resonate with the R/B Gyros and her own accidentally awaken the monster. Gomora shrugged off the Aizentech's Anti-Monster Restraint System and fought against Rosso and Blu before being defeated by Grand King Megalos. First appeared in episodes 26 and 27 of Ultraman.
: A stronger variant of Demaaga from episode 1 of Ultraman X, appearing in the first live stage of Ultraman Festival 2018.
: Riku/Geed's alien companion.
: Geed defeated it with the Strike Boost.
: Rosso and Blu defeated it with the Splash Bomb and the Storm Shooting.
Robot Monster Mecha Gomora (Movie): Appeared on a planet where Pigmons inhabit, Rosso defeated it with the Orb Ring NEO's Zedcium Ray.

Novel-exclusives
Despite her kind and caring facade, in truth Bakubarba personally trains the orphans into hired mercenaries for her own ends and even engaged with various criminal activities. She sent Saki and her brothers into various mercenary works before secretly banishing them out of the planet due to being the target of various criminal groups. When the siblings return, Saki killed Bakubarba after she turned the orphanage into a child-trafficking hub, giving its ownership to the Interstellar Alliance alongside its orphans.
Under the wish of their client , Bakubarba sent the three siblings to kill the monster as they interrupt the sacrificial ceremony.
: One of the bosses of a space gang which set their sight on Rosso, Blu and Saki after numerous deaths of gang members. When the troop that chased the siblings to Planet O-50 were eliminate, Balsas set their group in a final fight by unleashing their monster Fearmonger.
: Balsas' monster in possession, first appeared in episode 50 of Ultraman 80. It leads a band of mercenaries towards the three siblings, Rosso, Blu and Saki while climbing the cold mountain Warrior's Peak of O-50. The monster and the entire Balsas troop were killed by Rosso, Blu and Grigio upon their transformation into Ultramen and monster.
: The strongest monster on Balsas' possession, it was released for the final fight against the three siblings after they killed Bakubarba. Although the battle ended with Rosso, Blu and Grigio King victorious, the two brothers previously failed in trying to unite their powers into Ultraman Ruebe due to their inability to resonate with Saki.
: A greedy alien whose interested in the rare minerals of Planet Gion. To that end, he brought the Barrigator robots to eliminate the entire Zarra Tribe and faced against the three siblings. While trying to escape Grigio Regina, Ciel used the escape pod to exit his second Barrigator but was incinerated and reduced to dusts by Regina's energy beam.
: A pair of robots used by Alien Egon "Ciel" to invade Planet Gion and eliminate the Zarra Tribe. While leaving the first model autopiloted against Rosso and Blu, Ciel rode the second model to eliminate the Zarra people as Saki obtained the Grigio Regina crystal and used its massive power to disable the robot.

Notes

References

External links
Official website for the character list of Ultraman R/B
Official website for the character list of Ultraman R/B the Movie

, Ultraman R B
R B